The 2016 Czech Republic motorcycle Grand Prix was the eleventh round of the 2016 MotoGP season. It was held at the Masaryk Circuit in Brno on 21 August 2016.

Classification

MotoGP

Moto2

 Thomas Lüthi suffered a concussion in a crash during qualifying.

Moto3

Championship standings after the race (MotoGP)
Below are the standings for the top five riders and constructors after round eleven has concluded.

Riders' Championship standings

Constructors' Championship standings

 Note: Only the top five positions are included for both sets of standings.

References

2016 MotoGP race reports
Motorcycle Grand Prix
2016
Czech Republic motorcycle Grand Prix